The 2020 HFX Wanderers FC season was the second season in the club's history, as well as second season in Canadian Premier League history. The Wanderers were CPL runners-up, having been defeated by Forge FC in the 2020 CPL Final.

Current squad

Transfers

In

Draft picks 
HFX Wanderers selected the following players in the 2019 CPL–U Sports Draft on November 11, 2019. Draft picks are not automatically signed to the team roster. Only those who are signed to a contract will be listed as transfers in.

Out

Canadian Premier League

Match times are Atlantic Daylight Time (UTC−3).

First stage

Table

Results by match

Matches

Group stage

Table

Results by round

Matches

Final

Statistics

Squad and statistics 

|-
 

 

 
 
 
 

 
 
 
 
  

 
 
 
 
 
|-
|}

Top scorers 
{| class="wikitable sortable alternance"  style="font-size:85%; text-align:center; line-height:14px; width:85%;"
|-
!width=10|Rank
!width=10|Nat.
! scope="col" style="width:275px;"|Player
!width=10|Pos.
!width=80|Canadian Premier League
!width=80|TOTAL
|-
|1|||| Akeem Garcia        || FW || 6 ||6
|-
|2|||| João Morelli        || MF || 4 ||4
|-
|rowspan=5|3|||| Ibrahima Sanoh         || FW || 1 ||1
|-
|||| Omar Kreim         || FW || 1 ||1
|-
|||| Alex De Carolis         || DF || 1 ||1
|-
|||| Cory Bent         || FW || 1 ||1
|-
|||| Alessandro Riggi         || FW || 1 ||1
|- class="sortbottom"
| colspan="4"|Totals||15||15

Top assists 
{| class="wikitable sortable alternance"  style="font-size:85%; text-align:center; line-height:14px; width:85%;"
|-
!width=10|Rank
!width=10|Nat.
! scope="col" style="width:275px;"|Player
!width=10|Pos.
!width=80|Canadian Premier League
!width=80|TOTAL
|-
|rowspan=2|1||||Andre Rampersad||MF||2||2
|-
|||Alex Marshall||FW||2||2
|-
|rowspan=2|3||||Alessandro Riggi||MF||1||1
|-
||| João Morelli|| MF || 1 ||1
|-
|- class="sortbottom"
| colspan="4"|Totals||6||6

Clean sheets 
{| class="wikitable sortable alternance"  style="font-size:85%; text-align:center; line-height:14px; width:85%;"
|-
!width=10|Rank
!width=10|Nat.
! scope="col" style="width:275px;"|Player
!width=80|Canadian Premier League
!width=80|TOTAL
|-
|1|||| Christian Oxner || 2 ||2
|-
|- class="sortbottom"
| colspan="3"|Totals||2||2

Disciplinary record 
{| class="wikitable sortable alternance"  style="font-size:85%; text-align:center; line-height:14px; width:85%;"
|-
!rowspan="2" width=10|No.
!rowspan="2" width=10|Pos.
!rowspan="2" width=10|Nat.
!rowspan="2" scope="col" style="width:275px;"|Player
!colspan="2" width=80|Canadian Premier League
!colspan="2" width=80|TOTAL
|-
! !!  !!  !! 
|-
|1||GK|||| Jason Beaulieu    ||1||0||1||0
|-
|2||DF|||| Peter Schaale    ||3||0||3||0
|-
|3||DF|||| Jems Geffrard ||1||0||1||0
|-
|5||MF|||| Louis Béland-Goyette    ||3||0||3||0
|-
|7||FW|||| Alex Marshall    ||1||0||1||0
|-
|14||DF|||| Mateo Restrepo ||1||0||1||0
|-
|18||MF|||| Andre Rampersad ||2||0||2||0
|-
|20||MF|||| Jake Ruby ||1||0||1||0
|-
|22||MF|||| João Morelli ||0||1||0||1
|-
|24||DF|||| Alex De Carolis ||1||0||1||0
|-
|50||GK|||| Christian Oxner ||2||0||2||0
|- class="sortbottom"
| colspan="4"|Totals||16||1||16||1

Notes

References

External links 
Official site

2020
2020 Canadian Premier League
Canadian soccer clubs 2020 season
2020 in Nova Scotia